The Chatenet Commission was the last Commission of the European Atomic Energy Community (Euratom), between 1962 and 1967. Its president was Pierre Chatenet of France. There were only three Commissions, this being the last, before the institutions of Euratom were merged with those of the European Coal and Steel Community and the European Economic Community in 1967 to become the European Communities.

Commissions of the European Atomic Energy Community